Hugh Tuten ("Hugh Boy") Lightsey (May 3, 1925 − March 22, 2019) was an American politician in the state of South Carolina. He served in the South Carolina House of Representatives from 1965 to 1971, representing Hampton County, South Carolina. Lightsey was born in Brunson, South Carolina and served in the United States Navy during World War II. Lightsey graduated from The Citadel, The Military College of South Carolina. He was a farmer and businessman. Lightsey died on March 22, 2019, aged 93.

References

1925 births
2019 deaths
People from Hampton County, South Carolina
The Citadel, The Military College of South Carolina alumni
Military personnel from South Carolina
Businesspeople from South Carolina
Farmers from South Carolina
Democratic Party members of the South Carolina House of Representatives
20th-century American businesspeople